The Ministry of Energy and Water is the government ministry responsible for energy, water, resources, mines and quarries in Lebanon.

Ministers 

 Maurice Sehnaui - 2004 - 2005
 Gebran Bassil - 2009 - 2014
 Nada Boustani Khouri - from  4 February 2019.
 Raymond Ghajar - from 21 January 2020 to 10 September 2021, in the cabinet of Hassan Diab. On 10 August 2020, the entire cabinet resigned but continued to serve in a caretaker capacity until the new government was formed.
 Walid Fayad - from 10 September 2021 to present, in Third Cabinet of Najib Mikati.

References

External links 
 Official website

Energy and Water
Lebanon, Energy and Water